Leverkusen Mitte (Bahnhof Leverkusen Mitte) is a railway station on the Cologne–Duisburg railway, located in Leverkusen, Germany. It is classified by Deutsche Bahn as a category 4 station. It is served by the S6 line of the Rhine-Ruhr S-Bahn at 20-minute intervals.

Train services
The station is served by the following services:

Regional services  NRW-Express Aachen - Cologne - Düsseldorf - Duisburg - Essen - Dortmund - Hamm - Paderborn
Regional services  Rhein-Express Emmerich - Wesel - Oberhausen - Duisburg - Düsseldorf - Cologne - Bonn - Koblenz
Rhein-Ruhr S-Bahn services  Essen - Kettwig - Düsseldorf - Cologne - Köln-Nippes

Bus services 

It is also served by the following bus routes: 201 (20 minute intervals), 203 (60), 204 (30), 208 (20), 209 (20), 211 (20) and 212 (20), 220 (20), 227 (20) and 233 (20), operated by Kraftverkehr Wupper-Sieg; and 250 (60) and 255 (20), operated by Kraftverkehr Gebr. Wiedenhoff.

References 

Buildings and structures in Leverkusen
Railway stations in North Rhine-Westphalia
Railway stations in Germany opened in 1979
S6 (Rhine-Ruhr S-Bahn)
Rhine-Ruhr S-Bahn stations